Sergei Vyacheslavovich Androsov (born 18 February 1986) is a Russian former professional footballer.

External links
 
 

1986 births
Living people
Russian footballers
Association football defenders
Russian expatriate footballers
Expatriate footballers in Belarus
FC Asmaral Moscow players
FC Sodovik Sterlitamak players
FC Vitebsk players
FC Salyut Belgorod players
Belarusian Premier League players